Surge Rocks are a group of five rocks, two always exposed, lying  southwest of Eichorst Island and  south-southeast of Bonaparte Point, Anvers Island. The name was suggested by Palmer Station personnel in 1972. Ocean swells working on the shoal surrounding these rocks, cause breaking and a "surge" of the water level in any weather condition.

References

Rock formations of the Palmer Archipelago